Hajj Abdeh Mohammad (also Romanized as Ḩājj ʿAbdeh Moḩammad) is a village in Shamsabad Rural District, in the Central District of Dezful County, Khuzestan Province, Iran. At the 2006 census, its population was 560, in 126 families.

References 

Populated places in Dezful County